Giuseppe Moriani was an Italian painter of the Baroque period, active mainly in Tuscany in the late 17th and early 18th century.

He was strongly influenced by Giovanni Camillo Sagrestani. He painted the Story of Santa Verdiana in the church of Santa Verdiana in Castelfiorentino, in collaboration with Sagrestani, Ranieri del Pace,  Niccolò Lapi, Antonio Puglieschi, and Agostino Veracini. In the museum of sacred art in Greve in Chianti, is Moriani's Healing of the blind since birth. He painted the canvases of Miracles of San Francesco di Paola for the Church of San Francesco di Paola, Florence.

Among other Italian persons named Giuseppe Moriani is a violinist, and also a Florentine glassblower.

Sources
Italian Wikipedia entry

17th-century Italian painters
Italian male painters
18th-century Italian painters
Painters from Tuscany
Italian Baroque painters
Year of death unknown
Year of birth unknown
18th-century Italian male artists